Uwe Krause (born 13 October 1955) is a German former professional footballer who played as a striker. He spent most of his career in France.

References

External links
 Uwe Krause at TangoFoot 
 
 

1955 births
Living people
Sportspeople from Braunschweig
Association football forwards
German footballers
German expatriate footballers
Expatriate footballers in Monaco
German expatriate sportspeople in Monaco
Expatriate footballers in France
German expatriate sportspeople in France
Bundesliga players
Eintracht Braunschweig players
Ligue 1 players
Stade Lavallois players
AS Monaco FC players
FC Sochaux-Montbéliard players
FC Sète 34 players
Footballers from Lower Saxony
20th-century German people